Naval Hospital Orlando  is a former United States Navy hospital.  The hospital was founded in 1968 when the Navy took over an Air Force facility.  It was closed in 1995. The facility was transferred the United States Department of Veterans Affairs as the Lake Baldwin VA Clinic.

References

Medical installations of the United States Navy
1995 disestablishments in Florida
Healthcare in Orlando, Florida
Defunct hospitals in Florida
Hospitals disestablished in 1995
Military installations closed in 1995
Military hospitals in the United States
Hospitals established in 1968
1968 establishments in Florida